Adán Torres (born September 11, 1923, date of death unknown) was an Argentine runner. He competed in the men's 800 metres at the 1948 Summer Olympics. At an unknown date, Torres committed suicide upon becoming disabled after being struck by a truck.

References

1923 births
Year of death missing
Argentine male middle-distance runners
Olympic athletes of Argentina
Athletes (track and field) at the 1948 Summer Olympics
Suicides in Argentina
Sportspeople with disabilities